The 2020–21 season was the seventh season in Kerala Blasters FC's existence, as well as their seventh season in Indian Super League. Due to COVID-19 pandemic, all the matches in the seventh season of ISL were played behind closed doors in three venues at Goa. GMC Athletic Stadium was chosen as the home venue for the Blasters.

Season overview

Background
On 15 March 2020, Kerala Blasters appointed Karolis Skinkys as their new Sporting director ahead of the new season. On 22 April, the club officially announced the signing of Kibu Vicuña as their new manager. The most surprising move was the departure of Sandesh Jhingan: he departed the club on 21 May in a mutual consent thus ending his six years association with the club. The CEO, Viren D'Silva, also left the club on the same day.

July
On 1 July 2020, Kerala Blasters officially announced that they had extended the contract of Jessel Carneiro until 2023

On 8 July, the club announced the signing of goalkeeper Albino Gomes on a free transfer from Odisha FC.

On 15 July, it was announced that the young midfielder Ritwik Das has joined the club from Real Kashmir.

The signing of Nishu Kumar was finally confirmed by the club on 22 July. The four-year deal made Nishu the highest paid Indian defender.

On 29 July, the club announced the contract extension of  Abdul Hakku until 2023.

August
On 5 August, Kerala Blasters completed the signing of left back Denechandra Meitei from TRAU F.C.

On 12 August, it was announced that Sahal has extended his contract for three more years with the Blasters which made him to stay at the club until 2025.

On 19 August, the club announced the signing of Indian Under 19 midfielder Givson Singh from Indian Arrows.

On 22 August, Blasters announced  the signing of  Sandeep Singh from TRAU F.C.

On 26 August, the club completed the signing of Rohit Kumar from Hyderabad FC.

On 28 August, the departure of captain Bartholomew Ogbeche was officially announced by the club.

September
On 2 September, Kerala Blasters announced the signing of Facundo Pereyra as their first foreign signing of the season. He became the first Argentine to sign for the club.

On 9 September, the club announced the signing of India National Under 20 goalkeeper Prabhsukhan Singh Gill on a two-year deal.

On 12 September, Kerala Blasters announced the contract extension of local boy Prasanth Karuthadathkuni until 2021.

On 16 September, the club announced the signing of young midfielder Puitea from NorthEast United FC on a three-year deal.

On 19 September,  Blasters extended the contract of Seityasen Singh until 2022.

On 23 September, Blasters announced the signing of Spanish Midfielder Vicente Gómez Umpiérrez on a three-year deal.

On 30 September, Blasters announced the contract extension of Rahul KP until 2025.

October
On 5 October, the Blasters announced the signing of Gary Hooper on a one-year deal.

On 8 October, the Blasters started their pre-season training camp under the assistant coach Ishfaq Ahmed.

On 9 October, the Blasters announced the signing of Costa Nhamoinesu. After this deal, Nhamoinesu became the first Zimbabwean to play for the club.

On 21 October, the Blasters announced the signing of Burkina Faso international defender Bakary Koné as their sixth foreign signing of the season.

On 24 October, the Blasters announced the signing of Australian forward Jordan Murray as their AFC affiliated player and final foreign signing of the season.

November
On 7 November, the Blasters  announced its association with BYJU'S, the world's largest Ed-Tech company, as their new title sponsor with an option to extend the sponsorship.

On 18 November, the Blasters announced Costa Nhamoinesu, Sergio Cidoncha, and Jessel Carneiro as the captains ahead of the new season with Nhamoinesu being the first choice captain.

On 20 November, the Blasters lost 1–0 to ATK Mohun Bagan in the 2020-21 ISL season opener.

On 26 November, the Blasters drew 2–2 against NorthEast United FC.

On 29 November, the Blasters had a goalless draw against Chennaiyin FC in the South Indian Derby.

December
On 6 December, the Blasters lost 3–1 against FC Goa.

On 8 December, the Blasters confirmed that the club captain Sergio Cidoncha, who tore his right ankle ligament during the match against Chennaiyin has left for Spain to recover from the injury and will miss the remainder of the season.

On 12 December, the Blasters extended the contract of Jeakson Singh until 2023.

On 13 December, the Blasters lost 4–2 against Bengaluru in the South Indian Derby.

On 20 December, the Blasters drew 1–1 against SC East Bengal.

On 27 December, the Blasters won 2–0 against Hyderabad FC, registering their first victory of the season.

On 28 December, the Blasters announced the signing of Juande as an injury replacement of Cido for the remainder of the season.

On 29 December, the Blasters announced that they have signed Subha Ghosh from ATK Mohun Bagan on a three-year contract; a swap deal with Nongdamba Naorem for whom the Blasters received an undisclosed transfer fee.

January
On 2 January 2021, the Blasters lost 2–0 against Mumbai City FC.

On 7 January, the Blasters lost 4–2 against Odisha FC.

On 9 January, the Blasters extended the contract of Prasanth K until 2023.

On 10 January, the Blasters won 3–2 against Jamshedpur FC. After this game, Sahal Abdul Samad became the player with second most appearances for the Blasters.

On 15 January, the Blasters drew 1–1 against SC East Bengal. The game saw Albino Gomes becoming the first Indian goalkeeper and only second goalkeeper overall to provide an assist in Indian Super League.

On 20 January, the Blasters defeated Bengaluru FC 2–1 in the Southern Derby.

On 23 January, the Blasters drew 1–1 against FC Goa.

On 27 January, the Blasters had a goalless draw against Jamshedpur FC.

On 29 January, the Blasters confirmed that Facundo Pereyra has suffered a broken nose before the match against Jamshedpur FC.

On 31 January, the Blasters lost 3–2 against ATK Mohun Bagan FC.

February
On 4 February, the Blasters lost 1–2 against Mumbai City FC.
 
On 11 February, the Blasters drew 2–2 against Odisha FC.

On 16 February, the Blasters lost 4–0 to Hyderabad FC.

On 17 February, the club parted ways with their head coach Kibu Vicuna on mutual consent. Ishfaq Ahmed was appointed as the interim head coach for the remainder of season.

On 20 February, the club extended the contract of defender Sandeep Singh until 2022.

On 21 February, the Blasters drew 1–1 against Chennaiyin FC in the Southern Derby.

On 26 February, the Blasters lost 2–0 against NorthEast United FC in their final match of the league.

Players
Note: The list contains all the players who were registered by the club for the 2020-21 season

Other players under contract 
Note: Player was deregistered from Indian Super League squad due to an injury.

Contract Extensions

Transfers

Transfers In

Promotion from reserves and youth

Loan Returns

Loan Outs

Transfers Out

Management

Pre-season and friendlies

Owing the COVID-19 pandemic, all the clubs including Kerala Blasters FC couldn't have a proper preseason. The preseason time was cut short this season. The Blasters began their preseason against one of their fellow Indian Super League opponent, Hyderabad FC on 25 October 2020. Both squads had fielded Indian players only as the foreign players were on quarantine. In the end, the Blasters beat Hyderabad 2–0 with Rahul K.P. netting both the goals.

Competitions

Indian Super League

League table

League Results by round

Matches

Statistics 
All stats are as of 26 February 2021

Squad appearances and goals

|-
! colspan=10 style=background:#dcdcdc; text-align:center| Goalkeepers

|-
! colspan=10 style=background:#dcdcdc; text-align:center| Defenders

 |-
! colspan=11 style=background:#dcdcdc; text-align:center| Midfielders

|-
! colspan=10 style=background:#dcdcdc; text-align:center| Forwards

|}

Squad statistics

Players Used: 26

Goalscorers

Assists

Clean sheets

Disciplinary record

Footnotes

See also
 2020-21 Indian Super League season
 Indian Super League
 Kerala Blasters FC
 List of Kerala Blasters FC seasons

References

Kerala Blasters FC seasons
Kerala Blasters FC